The 2014–15 Milwaukee Panthers men's basketball team represented the University of Wisconsin–Milwaukee during the 2014–15 NCAA Division I men's basketball season. The Panthers, led by tenth year head coach Rob Jeter, played their home games at the UW–Milwaukee Panther Arena and the Klotsche Center and were members of the Horizon League. They finished the season 14–16, 9–7 in Horizon League play to finish in fifth place.

Due to Academic Progress Rate penalties, Milwaukee were ineligible for a postseason tournament including the 2015 Horizon League men's basketball tournament.

Roster

Schedule

All conference games aired on the Horizon League website

|-
!colspan=9 style="background:#000000; color:#FDBB30;"| Exhibition

|-
!colspan=9 style="background:#000000; color:#FDBB30;"| Regular season

|-

References

Milwaukee
Milwaukee Panthers men's basketball seasons